Trichogenes is a genus of pencil catfishes. It is currently the only genus within the subfamily Trichogeninae. 

A third species was described in 2020 from archival material of unknown origin. The wild distribution of the new species, T. beagle, is unknown.

Distribution
Trichogenes species are endemic to Brazil.

Species
There are currently three recognized species in this genus:

 Trichogenes beagle 
 Trichogenes claviger de Pinna, Helmer, Britski & Nunes, 2010
 Trichogenes longipinnis Britski & Ortega, 1983

References

Trichomycteridae
Fish of Brazil
Freshwater fish genera
Catfish genera
Taxa named by Heraldo Antonio Britski
Taxa named by Hernán Ortega